The Karlovy Vary–Johanngeorgenstadt railway connects Karlovy Vary in the Czech Republic with Johanngeorgenstadt in Saxony, Germany. The entire line was opened for regular traffic in 1899.

The railway station at Pernink is the highest in the Ore Mountains and was for a short time also the highest railway station in the Bohemian Kingdom.

Shortly after the end of the Second World War, cross-border traffic was terminated. The track between the Czechoslovak Socialist Republic and East Germany was maintained for military reasons only. After the fall of communism in Central Europe in 1989, the newly elected democratic governments of both countries began discussions on the restoration of cross-border traffic; this was finally achieved in 1992.

The line is operated by railcars of ČD Class 814 Regionova. During periods of heavy snowfall, they are replaced by diesel locomotives of ČD class 714 with two to three BDtax passenger cars. Services of the DB's subsidiary, Erzgebirgsbahn, are worked by Siemens Desiro Classics.

International railway lines
Railway lines opened in 1899
Transport in the Ore Mountains
Railway lines in the Czech Republic
Karlovy Vary Region
Railway lines in Saxony
Erzgebirgskreis
1899 establishments in Europe
Czechoslovakia–Germany relations